Henry Woodfall may refer to:

 Henry Sampson Woodfall (1739–1805), English printer and journalist
 Henry Dick Woodfall (1796–1869), English businessman